Podvinje is a village north of Dobova in the Municipality of Brežice in eastern Slovenia, close to the border with Croatia. The area is part of the traditional region of Styria. It is now included in the Lower Sava Statistical Region. The Jovsi wetland lies east of the village.

Church

The local church is dedicated to the Holy Trinity and belongs to the Parish of Kapele. It is a single-naved building with a three-sided sanctuary built in the 17th century. In the 18th century it was vaulted and the bell tower was built in 1776.

References

External links
Podvinje on Geopedia

Populated places in the Municipality of Brežice